The House of Enlightenment, Denis Diderot or La Maison des Lumières Denis Diderot (MLDD) is a museum dedicated to Denis Diderot, the French philosopher, writer, and art critic, as well as his Encyclopédie, ou Dictionnaire raisonné des sciences, des arts et des métiers. It is housed in the Hotel du Breuil de Saint Germain, located in Langres (Champagne-Ardenne region of France), built in the sixteenth century and rebuilt in the eighteenth century.

The museum was designed by Atelier à Kiko and the garden by landscape architect Louis Benech.
 
The house is organized into 10 themed rooms, or salles, including a chronology of the Enlightenment, Denis Diderot in Langres and his later life in Paris, Diderot's journey to Russia, Diderot and art criticism, theater criticism, Diderot and music, the Encyclopedia.

General Information 
The museum is open all year, Tuesdays–Sundays. The explanations of the exhibits are not multilingual but an audio guide, Diderot et sa ville, is available in Dutch, English, French or German (2013).

External links 

 Official website of the museum in Langres
 Generell informationen about the museum (PDF; 1,2 MB)
 Official poster for the museum, MLDD
 Video documentation of the opening day of Dailymotion

References 

National museums of France
Poetry museums
History museums
Haute-Marne
Denis Diderot